Kukeli may refer to:
Burim Kukeli (b. 1984), Kosovan - Albanian footballer
Kukeli, Iran